Nostra Senyora de Jesús is a village on the northern side of  Ibiza Bay, On the Spanish island of Ibiza, Spain. The village is in the municipality of Santa Eulària des Riu and is located on the designated road PMV 810.

Description
The village of Jesús is a short distance along the road to Cala Llonga from Ibiza town. It is now more of a suburb of Ibiza town than a village, offering a wide range of restaurants and small shops. There are also several beaches in the vicinity of the village, such as Platja S'Estanyol and Talamanca.

The Can Pep Simó Estate

On the hillside above the village are two important housing developments. The Can Pep Simó estate, designed in the 1970s by Catalan architect’s of Erwin Broner and Josep Lluís Sert. The developments are described as a combination of traditional and modern architecture and attract students of architecture from across the globe.

The Church of Nostra Mare de Jesús

At the heart of the village is the white washed parish church of Nostra Mare de Jesús, considered to be the oldest church on the island. Despite the ever expanding sprawl of Ibiza town, there is still an open vista of the green fields and orchards towards the prominent hill of Dalt Vila. It is thought that Franciscan friars established the site in 1498. After fifty years the Franciscans left the site to the Dominican order, who eventually moved to the better protected Dalt Vila due to pirate raids. In 1755 that the old monastic building was turned into a parish church. What distinguished this church from others on the island is its altarpiece painted around 1500 by Rodrigo de Osona. The altarpiece has 25 painted panels, with the central panel having a representation of the Virgin and child. The surrounding panels have images of Saints and themes such as the Annunciation, Jesus Nativity, Resurrection, the Ascension.

References

Populated places in Ibiza